The 2015 NCAA Division II Men's Soccer Championship was the 44th annual single-elimination tournament to determine the national champion of NCAA Division II men's collegiate soccer in the United States. The semifinals and championship game were played at Ashton Brosnaham Stadium in Pensacola, Florida from December 3–5, 2015 while the preceding rounds were played at various sites across the country during November 2015.

Qualification
All Division II men's soccer programs were eligible to qualify for the 38-team tournament field. All Division II men's soccer programs were eligible to qualify for the 38-team tournament field. No teams received automatic bids; at-large bids are based on the teams' regular season records and the Quality of Winning Percentage Index. Teams were placed into one of four unbalanced super-regional brackets, consisting of eight or ten teams, based on geographic location.

Tournament bracket

Super Region No. 1 
Source:

Super Region No. 2 
Source:

Super Region No. 3 
Source:

Super Region No. 4 
Source:

 * Host schools

Division II College Cup

Final

See also 
 NCAA Men's Soccer Championships (Division I, Division III)
 NCAA Women's Soccer Championships (Division I, Division II, Division III)

References

NCAA Division II Men's Soccer Championship
NCAA Division II Men's Soccer Championship
NCAA Division II Men's Soccer Championship
NCAA Division II Men's Soccer Championship
NCAA Division II Men's Soccer Championship
Soccer in Florida